The Friss Hús Budapest International Short Film Festival (Friss Hús meaning "fresh meat") is an international short film festival held annually in Budapest, Hungary. The festival was first organised in 2013 by the Daazo Short Film Centre. During the years films in competition included Kristóf Deák's Oscar-winning short Sing and the Cannes prize winner animation Superbia by Luca Tóth.

Awards

External links 
 Official site
 Daazo - the European Short Film Centre

Short film festivals
Film festivals established in 2013
Film festivals in Hungary
Annual events in Hungary
Recurring events established in 2013